Marion Historic District dates from 1800. It was listed on the National Register of Historic Places in 1973 and its boundaries were increased in 1979.

References

Historic districts on the National Register of Historic Places in South Carolina
National Register of Historic Places in Marion County, South Carolina